Alberto Caramella (1928–2007) spent all his life in Florence. He was an Italian poet. His first poetical works were published in 1995 after a successful career as a lawyer. In 1997 he founded the "Fondazione il Fiore" in Florence, with the aim to promote Italian and international poetry.

Bibliography 
Mille scuse per esistere, Florence: Le Lettere, 1995
I viaggi del Nautilus, Florence: Le Lettere, 1997
Lunares murales, Florence: Le Lettere, 1999
Il soggetto è il mare (il libro dei nodi), Varese: Edizioni Stampa, 2000
Interrogazione di poesia, Milan: Crocetti, 2000
Cartella di vacanza (sur le Lac Léman), Florence: Edizioni Polistampa, 2000
Festa di Vivere i Mostri del Moto, Florence: Edizioni Artichaut, 2001
Poesie, a cura di C. Mariotti, Firenze, Polistampa, 2003
Pulizia, o del percezionismo, Florence: Passigli Editore, 2004
Il Libro Liberato, Florence: Passigli Editore, 2005.

Studies about Caramella's poetry 

 E. Giachery-N. Paolini Giachery, "Pas de deux": per la poesia di Alberto Caramella, Roma, Vecchiarelli, 2000
 Il frale nerbo: per Alberto Caramella. Atti della giornata di studi Bologna 5 ottobre 2001, a cura di F. Sberlati, Roma, Bulzoni, 2002 (contributi di F. Sberlati, A. Noferi, E. Giachery, A. Oldcorn, J.-Ch. Vegliante, M. Cucchi, L. Tassoni)
 G. Occhipinti, La voce della poesia, Panzano, Edizioni Feeria, 2004
 A. Guastella, Alberto Caramella poeta egizio & lunare in Studi cattolici, Luglio/Agosto 1999, pp. 530–33.
 Alberto Caramella. La tensione e il sogno, intervista di I. Boni in Galatea, Luglio/Agosto 1998, pp. 54–61
 Alberto Caramella, intervista di S. Gros-Pietro in Vernice, a. VII n. 19-20, pp. 6–20.
 C. Mariotti, Sulla scrittura aforistica di Alberto Caramella, in Caffè Michelangiolo, a. X n. 3, Settembre-Dicembre 2005, pp. 81–83.
 C. Mariotti, Sullo straripante amore di Alberto Caramella, in Feeria, a. XIV n. 29, Giugno 2006, pp. 54–58.

External links 
Official site (in Italian)
Fondazione il Fiore (in Italian)

1928 births
Italian male poets
2007 deaths
20th-century Italian poets
20th-century Italian male writers